Johan Gerard Hendrik "Jan" Elfring (8 February 1902 – 4 September 1977) was a Dutch footballer who participated at the 1928 Summer Olympics.

Career
He played club football for local sides Go Ahead 1918 and Alcmaria Victrix as well as for Robur et Velocitas in Apeldoorn after he moved to the city in 1929. Elfring made his debut for the Netherlands in an October 1926 friendly match against Germany and earned a total of 15 caps, scoring 2 goals. His final international was a December 1928 friendly against Italy.

References

External links

 Player profile at VoetbalStats.nl
 Player profile at Sport.nl

1902 births
1977 deaths
Sportspeople from Alkmaar
Association football wingers
Dutch footballers
Netherlands international footballers
Olympic footballers of the Netherlands
Footballers at the 1928 Summer Olympics
Footballers from North Holland